I Don't Know may refer to:

Songs
 "I Don't Know" (Fiestar song), 2013
 "I Don't Know" (Honeyz song), 2000
 "I Don't Know" (Joanne song), 2001
 "I Don't Know" (Mika Nakashima song), 2008
 "I Don’t Know" (Paul McCartney song), 2018
 "I Don't Know" (Ruth Brown song), 1959
 "I Don't Know" (The Sheepdogs song), 2010
 "I Don't Know" (Willie Mabon song), 1952
 "I Don't Know!", by J-pop duo BaBe, 1987
 "I Don't Know", by The Beach Boys from the album The Smile Sessions, 2011
 "I Don't Know", by Beastie Boys from the album Hello Nasty
 "I Don't Know", an English version of the song "Je sais pas" performed by Celine Dion from the album Falling into You
 "I Don't Know", by Dredg, 2009
 "I Don't Know", by The Esquires, 1969
 "I Don't Know", by Farhan Akhtar from Bharat Ane Nenu, 2018
 "I Don't Know", by James Brown, 1956
 "I Don't Know", by Lisa Hannigan from the album Sea Sew, 2009
 "I Don't Know", by Lostprophets from the album Start Something
 "I Don't Know", by Meek Mill
 "I Don't Know", by The Mekons from the album I Love Mekons, 1993
 "I Don't Know", by Noa, 1994
 "I Don't Know", by Ozzy Osbourne from the album Blizzard of Ozz, 1980
 "I Don't Know", by Paul Revere & The Raiders from the album Alias Pink Puzz, 1969
 "I Don't Know", by The Replacements from the album Pleased to Meet Me, 1987
 "I Don't Know", by Slum Village from the album Fantastic, Vol. 2, 2000
 "I Don't Know", by Usher from the album 8701, 2001
"I Don't Know", by Kanye West, 2021

Films
 I Don't Know, a 1972 short film directed by Penelope Spheeris
 I Don't Know (Nie wiem), a 1977 film directed by Krzysztof Kieślowski

See also
 "The Fear" (Lily Allen song), a 2009 song by Lily Allen for which "I Don't Know" was the working title
 "I Dunno" (Tion Wayne song), a 2020 song
 IDN (disambiguation)